The 2010 Premier League Knock-Out Cup was the 43rd edition of the Knockout Cup for tier two teams. It was contested throughout the Premier League season. The reigning champions were the Kings Lynn Stars. The 2010 champions were the Newcastle Diamonds after beating the Edinburgh Monarchs 91–88 over a two legged final.

Knock-out stages

Round 1
The draw for the 2010 Premier League KOC was taking at the 2009 AGM. 12 teams were drawn against each other, with 2 teams receiving 'byes' into the quarter-finals. These two teams that received a bye were the Redcar Bears and the Somerset Rebels.

Aggregate scores

First leg

Second leg

Quarter finals
8 Teams qualified for the quarter-finals of the PLKOC. These included the Somerset Rebels and the Redcar Bears who received 'byes' through to the quarter finals. The other six teams were Berwick Bandits, Birmingham Brummies, Edinburgh Monarchs, Kings Lynn Stars, Newcastle Diamonds, and Workington Comets. All 6 qualified through being victorious in Round 1 of the competition

Aggregate scores

First leg

Second leg

Semi finals
4 Teams qualified for the semi-finals of the PLKOC. These were Birmingham Brummies, Edinburgh Monarchs, Newcastle Diamonds and Workington Comets. All were victorious in there quarter final ties.

Aggregate scores

First leg

Second leg

The final
The Final was competed between the Edinburgh Monarchs and the Newcastle Diamonds. It was raced over two legs on 29 October and 31 October.

First leg

Second leg

See also
 Speedway in the United Kingdom

References

Speedway competitions in the United Kingdom
Premier League Knock-Out Cup
Speedway Premier League
Premier League Knock-Out Cup